Hakkapeliitta (Finnish pl. hakkapeliitat) is a historiographical term used for a Finnish light cavalryman in the service of King Gustavus Adolphus of Sweden during the Thirty Years' War (1618 to 1648). Hakkapeliitta is a 19th-century Finnish modification of a contemporary name given by foreigners in the Holy Roman Empire and variously spelled as Hackapelit, Hackapelite, Hackapell, Haccapelit, or Haccapelite. These terms were based on a Finnish battle cry hakkaa päälle, commonly translated as "Cut them down!"

The hakkapeliitta-style cavalry was first used during the Polish-Swedish Wars of the late 16th century. In the early 17th century the cavalry led by the Field Marshal Jacob De la Gardie participated in campaigns against Poland and Russia.  The Hakkapeliitta cavalry men led by Field Marshal Gustaf Horn were vital to the Swedish victories in Germany during the Thirty Years' War.

The Finnish military march Hakkapeliittain Marssi is named after hakkapeliittas.

Tactics
The Hakkapeliitta were well-trained Finnish light cavalrymen who excelled in skirmishing, raiding and reconnaissance. The greatest advantage of the fast and lightly armored Hakkapeliitta cavalry was its charge. They typically had a sword, a helmet, and leather armor or a breastplate of steel. They would attack at a full gallop, fire the first pistol at twenty paces and the second at five paces, and then draw the sword. The horse itself was used like another weapon, as it was used to trample enemy infantry.

The horses used by the Hakkapeliitta were the ancestors of the modern Finnhorse; they were strong and durable.

Organization 
The Swedish army then had three cavalry regiments from Finland:
Nyland and Tavastehus County Cavalry Regiment (Swedish: Nylands och Tavastehus läns kavalleriregemente)
Åbo and Björneborg County Cavalry Regiment  (Åbo och Björneborgs läns kavalleriregemente)
Viborg and Nyslott County Cavalry Regiment (Viborgs och Nyslotts läns kavalleriregemente)

Their most famous commander was Torsten Stålhandske (surname meaning "steelglove"), who was commissioned as a lieutenant-colonel with the Nyland and Tavastehus Cavalry Regiment in 1629 and led it for the first time in the Thirty Years' War.

The original provincial regiments (landskapsregementen) had been raised by splitting the old Grand regiments (Storregementen,  also "Land regiments" (landsregementen), organized by Gustavus Adolphus at the end of the 1610s,  forming 21 infantry and eight cavalry regiments as written in the Swedish constitution of 1634.

Notable battles 

The main battles in which the Hakkapeliitta took part during the Thirty Years' War were:

Breitenfeld in 1631
Lech in 1632
Battle of Alte Veste in 1632
Lützen in 1632
Nördlingen in 1634
Leipzig in 1642 (also known as the Second Battle of Breitenfeld or the First Battle of Leipzig)
Jankau in 1645

200 Hakkapeliitta were also part of the army which King Karl X Gustav of Sweden led across the frozen Danish straits in the winter of 1658, which enabled him to conquer Skåneland from Denmark in the Treaty of Roskilde.

Many Finnish soldiers served under the Swedish Empire. During the era of the Swedish Empire of the 17th century, the Finnish cavalry was constantly used in Germany, Bohemia, Poland, and Denmark. Parts of the cavalry were stationed in Estonia and Livonia.

In popular culture
 The Bearkillers, a protagonist faction in S.M. Stirling's Emberverse series, uses the Hakkapeliitta battle cry.
 The module of the Advanced Squad Leader board game system, depicting the Finnish forces in World War II, is titled Hakkaa Päälle!
 Nokian Tyres makes snow tires called Hakkapeliittas.
 Hakkapeliitta's feature in Eric Flint's 1632 novel series as one part of Gustav II Adolf's armies.
 The song "Rex Regi Rebellis" by Finnish metal band Turisas describes the adventures of the Hakkapeliitta and includes the battle cry Hakkaa päälle pohjan poika! (Strike them down, son of the North!).
 The Hakkapeliitta is included in the video game Age of Empires III as a mercenary unit, under the name hackapell. When Age of Empires III: Definitive Edition released, the Hackapell mercenary was removed and replaced with a more generic "Harquebusier" unit. This is due to the introduction of a full Swedes civilization, who can field non-mercenary Hakkapelit from the Stable. While historically the Hakkapeliitta are light cavalry, the game classifies them as Heavy Cavalry.
 In Civilization V, the Hakkapeliitta are a unique unit of the Swedish Empire under Gustavus Adolphus.

References

External links 

Midi tune
Orchestral mp3 version (archived link, 8 April 2005) by the Finnish Cavalry Tradition Band(archived link, 10 April 2006)

Military history of Finland
Military units and formations of Sweden
Cavalry
Thirty Years' War
Finnish people of the Thirty Years' War